Elaeocarpus glandulifer is a species of flowering plant in the Elaeocarpaceae family. It is endemic to Sri Lanka, mainly in South-western areas.

References

glandulifer
Endemic flora of Sri Lanka
Vulnerable plants
Taxonomy articles created by Polbot